Olena Oleksandrivna Muravyova or Elena Aleksandrowna Muravyova (Ukrainian: Муравйова Олена Олександрівна, Russian: Муравьёва Елена Александровна) (b. on 22 May (3 June) 1867 in Kharkov, Russian Empire (today Kharkiv, Ukraine) – died on 11 November 1939 in Kiev, Ukrainian SSR, Soviet Union), was an opera singer and vocal teacher. For more than 30 years of musical and educational activities in Kiev, she emerged as a prominent expert in vocal training, awarded Merited Artist of Ukrainian SSR (1938).

Biography
Olena Muravyova studied at the Moscow conservatory (1886-1888) From 1890 to 1901, she was a soloist of the Bolshoi Theatre in Moscow. From 1900 she was one of the most renown teachers of voice in Ukraine and schooled over 400 singers, among them Miliza Korjus, Zoia Gaidai, Ivan Kozlovsky, Larissa Rudenko, and Elena Petlyash. Over the years she kept close contact with Mykola Lysenko, Boris Lyatoshynsky, Viktor Kosenko, Levko Revutsky, and other composers of her time. She is buried at the Baikove Cemetery.

Professor Muravyova had enormous powers of persuasion and great patience through which she was able to explain simply and clearly, finely versed in the tricks of vocal art, always taking into account the subtle nuances of their individual characteristics. All her great theoretical knowledge was applied in practice, wielding and constantly enriching all her upper-singing classes with her own experience. In addition to teaching Muravyova, being a true artist, invested in the student's own thoughts.

References

20th-century Ukrainian women opera singers
Recipients of the title of Merited Artist of Ukraine
Soviet women opera singers
1867 births
1939 deaths
Women singers from the Russian Empire
19th-century women opera singers from the Russian Empire
20th-century Russian women opera singers